Surfin' M.O.D. is an EP from American crossover thrash band, M.O.D. It was released in 1988 on Megaforce Records and follows 1987's debut album, U.S.A. for M.O.D. In 1989, the band subsequently released Gross Misconduct, their second full length-studio album.

Apart from Billy Milano, it featured a completely different line-up compared to the first album released a little more than a year previous – it included among others, Tim Mallare on drums, who later went on to play with the thrash metal band Overkill.

This release has two parts:

-"The Movie" (track 1) which is a spoken word story featuring actual songs in between the dialogue for a fake movie.

-"The Sound Track Without The Movie" (tracks 2-8). It is the actual music from the movie separated into tracks and without all the dialogue.

Incorrect Track listing
The CD lists the following erroneous track list on the cover:

This track list is in fact incorrect, as "The Movie" is track one, "Sargent Drexell Theme" is only included as part of track one, and there is an unlisted CD-bonus track ("New Song") as track eight.

Actual Track listing
All songs written by M.O.D., unless stated otherwise

Track 8 is a CD bonus track.
The album includes several uncredited samples from the 1987 film "Back to the Beach", starring Frankie Avalon, Annette Funicello, Lori Loughlin and Connie Stevens.

Credits
 Billy Milano – vocals
 Louis Svitek – guitar
 John Monte – bass
 Tim Mallare – drums
 Recorded at Pyramid Sound, Ithaca, New York, USA
 Produced, engineered, and mixed by Alex Perialas
 Assistant engineered by Rob Hunter
 Cover art by Craig Hamilton

References

External links
Megaforce Records release page
MOD and SOD official fansite
BNR Metal discography page

1988 EPs
M.O.D. albums
Megaforce Records EPs
Albums produced by Alex Perialas